Acylita dukinfieldi is a species of moth of the family Noctuidae first described by William Schaus in 1894. It is found in Brazil. Its wingspan is about 30 mm.

Description
Head and thorax ochreous suffused with red brown; abdomen ochreous. Forewing bright pink; the costal edge ochreous; a slight white streak on the median nervure and the bases of the veins arising from it. Hindwing white very faintly tinged with brown.

References

Hadeninae
Moths of South America